Stratford (formerly, Stratton) is a census-designated place (CDP) in Kings County, California, United States. It is part of the Hanford–Lemoore Metropolitan Statistical Area. The population was 1,277 at the 2010 census, up from 1,264 at the 2000 census.

Geography
Stratford lies near the historic shoreline of Tulare Lake.

History
The town was originally named Stratton in 1901 for William Stratton of the Empire Land and Water Company.  The name was changed to Stratford in 1906 due to the efforts of the local women's club.  The first post office at Stratford opened in 1910.
From the 1930s through the 1970s, Stratford was the home of Irigaray's, a restaurant run by Mariana Irigaray and her daughter Alice, pioneering a Basque-inspired version of what would later be called California cuisine.

Many local residents are employed in agriculture, affected by the Great Recession and the California drought. Stratford has been affected by land subsidence.

In November 2016, the unemployment rate was estimated at 13.1%.

Transportation 
Kings Area Regional Transit (KART) operates regularly scheduled fixed route bus service, vanpool service for commuters and Dial-A-Ride (demand response) services throughout Kings County as well as to Fresno.

 Highway 41 runs north-northeast on the west side of town, connecting it with Kettleman City on the south and Lemoore on the north.

Education
Stratford Elementary School is within the Central Union School District.

Politics
In the state legislature, Stratford is located in the 14th Senate District, which is represented by Democrat Melissa Hurtado, and in the 32nd Assembly District, represented by Democrat Rudy Salas. Federally, Stratford is located in California's 21st congressional district and is represented by Democrat TJ Cox.

Stratford is represented on the Kings County Board of Supervisors by Joe Neves, a Stratford resident.

Demographics

2010
The 2010 United States Census reported that Stratford had a population of 1,277. Hispanic or Latino of any race were 1,069 persons (83.7%). The racial makeup of Stratford was 574 (44.9%) White, 19 (1.5%) Asian, 17 (1.3%) Native American, 16 (1.3%) African American, 1 (0.1%) Pacific Islander, 617 (48.3%) from other races, and 33 (2.6%) from two or more races.

The Census reported that 1,277 people (100% of the population) lived in households.  There were 312 households, of which 184 (59.0%) had children under the age of 18 living in them, 206 (66.0%) were opposite-sex married couples living together, 44 (14.1%) had a female householder with no husband present, 22 (7.1%) had a male householder with no wife present.  There were 18 (5.8%) unmarried opposite-sex partnerships, and 4 (1.3%) same-sex married couples or partnerships. 31 households (9.9%) were made up of individuals, and 13 (4.2%) had someone living alone who was 65 years of age or older. The average household size was 4.09.  There were 272 families (87.2% of all households); the average family size was 4.33.

433 people (33.9%) were under the age of 18, 143 people (11.2%) aged 18 to 24, 332 people (26.0%) aged 25 to 44, 277 people (21.7%) aged 45 to 64, and 92 people (7.2%) who were 65 years of age or older. The median age was 27.6 years. For every 100 females, there were 101.4 males.  For every 100 females age 18 and over, there were 99.5 males.

The homeowner vacancy rate was 1.9%; the rental vacancy rate was 2.7%.  827 people (64.8% of the population) lived in owner-occupied housing units and 450 people (35.2%) lived in rental housing units.

2000
At the 2000 United States Census, there were 1,264 people, 292 households and 259 families residing in the CDP. The racial makeup of the CDP was 33.47% White, 1.19% African American, 1.98% Native American, 1.74% Asian, 0.55% Pacific Islander, 54.83% from other races, and 6.25% from two or more races. Hispanic or Latino of any race were 75.95% of the population.

There were 292 households, of which 64.4% had children under the age of 18 living with them, 74.3% were married couples living together, 9.9% had a female householder with no husband present, and 11.0% were non-families. 8.2% of all households were made up of individuals, and 4.5% had someone living alone who was 65 years of age or older.  The average household size was 4.33 and the average family size was 4.57.

40.8% of the population were under the age of 18, 11.7% from 18 to 24, 26.4% from 25 to 44, 15.7% from 45 to 64, and 5.3% who were 65 years of age or older. The median age was 24 years. For every 100 females, there were 103.9 males.  For every 100 females age 18 and over, there were 106.6 males.

The median household income was $29,205 and the median family income was $35,481. Males had a median income of $33,750 versus $28,125 for females. The per capita income for the CDP was $9,790. About 20.2% of families and 24.8% of the population were below the poverty line, including 28.1% of those under age 18 and 6.9% of those age 65 or over.

References

Census-designated places in Kings County, California
Census-designated places in California